An acrobatic flip is a sequence of body movements in which a person leaps into the air and then rotates one or more times while airborne. Acrobatic flips are performed in acro dance, free running, gymnastics, cheerleading, high jumping, tricking (martial arts), goal celebrations and various other activities. This is in contrast to freestyle BMX flips, in which a person revolves in the air about a bicycle.

Acrobatic flips can be started from a stationary, standing position and they are also commonly executed immediately following another rotational move, such as a roundoff or handspring, so as to take advantage of the angular momentum developed in the preceding move. In general, the hands do not touch the floor during execution of a flip and performers typically strive to land on the feet in an upright position, but it is not required to be considered a flip.

Classification
Many variations of flips exist, with usage depending on the particular type of activity. In gymnastics, for example, flips conform to a small number of specific, rigorously defined forms and movements. In activities such as free running and tricking, however, there are seemingly endless variations of flips, though many of these are variations of the fundamental gymnastics flips. As a result, gymnastics nomenclature is often applied to flips found in other disciplines. In many cases, flips are generally categorized according to the direction of body rotation. For example, the body rotates in the forward direction (i.e., face first) in a front flip and in the opposite direction in a back flip.

Gymnastics
Gymnastics flips are performed in both men's and women's gymnastics, on various apparatus including the balance beam, vault, and floor. In all cases, gymnastics flips require the hips to pass over the head. Four body forms are commonly employed in gymnastics flips:

 Aerial – Unbent knees, with legs in a forward or side split and aligned on the rotational plane, resulting in a front aerial or side aerial, respectively.
 Tuck – Legs together, with knees fully bent and drawn to the chest and hands clutching the knees or otherwise held close to the body. By "tucking" together tightly in this manner, the body is able to reach maximum angular velocity and thus minimize the time required for the body to complete its revolution. When initiated from a stationary, standing position, a tuck is classified as a "standing" tuck. This skill may also include a rotation using torque twist to make a 360 rotation; such a tuck is called a back tuck full.

 Layout – Body fully extended with legs together, unbent hips and knees, and arms held against the sides. Compared to the back tuck, this flip requires both higher angular momentum and greater height above the floor in order to ensure sufficient time to complete the rotation before landing.To initiate the flip you must bring your arms down from against your ears and down to your hips to help initiate the flip and to control the momentum coming down so you can land it. A layout may also include axial body rotation in addition to the fundamental rotation about the waist; such a layout is called a twist. Twists are further categorized by the number of axial rotations completed while airborne. For example, a layout with 180 degree twist is a half twist, 360 degrees for a full twist, and multiples of 360 degrees for double full and triple full twists, and so on.
 Pike – Bent hips, with knees straight and legs together.

Many gymnastics flips are descriptively named, based on the direction of rotation and the body position that is assumed during execution. For example, a front flip performed with a tucked body form is called a front tuck. When initiated from a stationary, standing position, a front tuck is called a standing front tuck.

Variations

Common modifications
These modifications are applicable to many types of flips:

 Gainer. A back flip that ends with the performer forward of the starting point due to forward momentum.
 Loser. A front flip that ends with the performer behind the starting position due to backward momentum.
 Switch. A flip that is launched from and lands on the same leg.

Tucks
 Pitch tuck. An assisted back tuck that is executed by partners. One partner forms a "saddle" with his hands. The second partner steps onto the saddle and then the first partner thrusts the saddle upward. The second partner, who is propelled upward with back rotation, executes a back tuck.
 Cowboy tuck. A tuck with knees and feet separated.
 Arabian. A tucking flip that begins backwards but with a half twist after take-off it changes into a front tuck.

Layouts
 X-in or X-out, in which legs and arms are split normal to the rotational plane so as to form an "X".
 Layout or Straight, where the performer's legs are kept together and relatively straight and whipped over the head

Tricking and b-boying
A virtually unlimited number of flip variants has been spawned within various activities, many having proprietary nomenclature.

See also
 List of gymnastics flips
 Handspring (gymnastics)
 Somersault

Gymnastics elements

it:Salto mortale